The William & Mary Tribe college football team competes in the NCAA Division I Football Championship Subdivision (formerly known as Division I-AA), representing the College of William & Mary in the Colonial Athletic Association. William & Mary has played its home games at Zable Stadium in Williamsburg, Virginia since 1935.

William & Mary fielded its first intercollegiate football team during the 1893 season. Between 1896 and 1908 the team's nickname was "Orange and White", derived from the school's former colors (William & Mary now uses green and gold). Since white uniforms dirtied too quickly, they became known as the "Orange and Black" from 1910 through 1916. Between 1917 and 1977 they were known as the Indians, and throughout this period a man dressing up as a Native American would ride around on a pony along the sidelines during games. This practice was discontinued when the outcry of stereotyping Native Americans as well as the use of a live animal became controversial. Since the 1978 season William & Mary has adopted the nickname "Tribe."

Throughout its history, William & Mary has been a member of six different athletic conferences. Three of these—the South Atlantic Intercollegiate Athletic Association, Virginia Conference and Yankee Conference—are now defunct. The Tribe's membership as a Southern Conference school is its longest tenure with one conference; they had a 40-year membership between 1936 and 1976. William & Mary's current league, the Colonial Athletic Association (CAA), has only been a football conference since 2007. The CAA began competing in football as a result of the Atlantic 10 Conference's disbanding of the sport following the 2006 season. The A-10's remaining football schools joined the CAA football conference to continue competing in the sport. For all intents and purposes, including the conference's automatic bid to the FCS playoffs, the A-10 football conference became the present-day CAA football conference.

Through the 2022 season, William & Mary has earned 13 I-AA/FCS playoff berths. In two of these years (1988 and 1992) the Tribe has declined the bid, opting instead to play in the Epson Ivy Bowl, which was a short-lived college football bowl game played in Japan against a team composed of Japanese all-stars. The Epson Ivy Bowl is not recognized by the NCAA as an official game and therefore does not count towards official win–loss records. In the playoffs, William & Mary has reached the national semifinals two times (2004 and 2009), and in each of those seasons won a program record 11 wins. Previously in the Tribe's history they have also earned three postseason bowl game appearances, compiling one win and two losses. There have also been 13 conference championships and one division championship; five of the conference titles and the lone division title were won under head coach Jimmye Laycock, who was the head coach from 1980 through 2018.

Seasons

Notes

 Since the 1978 split in divisions, the NCAA, or more recently, The Sports Network Poll has been the major poll at the FCS level.
 The FCS Coaches' Poll was introduced in 2007. Therefore, polls for prior seasons do not exist.
 Overtime rules in college football were implemented in 1996, making ties impossible moving forward.
 The Fall 2020 CAA season was delayed due to the COVID-19 pandemic, with league play resuming in a shortened Spring 2021 season.

References
General

Specific

William and Mary Tribe
 
William & Mary Tribe football seasons